Gaylen James Byker (born 1948) is a former international businessman and former president of Calvin College in Grand Rapids, Michigan. He is a director for InterOil Corporation. 

Byker is a native of Hudsonville, Michigan. He served in the United States Army from 1967 until 1970.  Following his service in the Vietnam War, he attended Calvin College graduating in 1973. He went on to do graduate work, and received a master's degree in world politics and a JD from the University of Michigan, as well as a doctorate from the University of Pennsylvania. 

After completing his education, he worked in the fields of international banking and energy.  He also taught at American University of Beirut.  Byker married Susan Lemmen in 1970 and they have two daughters. 

In May 2011, Byker announced he would retire as president of Calvin College at the end of the 2011–2012 academic year.

References

External links
 Gaylen J. Byker
 Directors of InterOil Corporation
 

1948 births
Living people
Calvin University alumni
University of Michigan Law School alumni
Presidents of Calvin University
American members of the Christian Reformed Church in North America
Acton Institute

20th-century American businesspeople
People from Hudsonville, Michigan